Kanyādāna  is a Hindu wedding ritual. One possible origin of this tradition can be traced to 15th century stone inscriptions found in Vijayanagara empire in South India. There are different interpretations regarding kanyādān across India (South Asia).

Origin 
Kanyādāna  is a Hindu wedding ritual dating as far back as the 15th century, as can be evidenced by several stone inscriptions found in the Vijayanagara empire. As the name suggests, Kanyā = girl, dāna= acceptance, meaning suggest as per sandhiviched= accepting a girl to a man's family. In a deep meaning, a father is giving his responsibility of her girl to a man, who will handle this further, as he was handling. Also we can say bride is accepting groom Gotra.

Kanyādāna songs
In communities where kanyādāna is performed as part of the actual wedding, the ritual is carried out through a variety of kanyādāna songs. These songs may include the parents lamenting the loss of their daughter, as well as regretting their economic sacrifice for the wedding. Other songs focus on the groom, for example comparing him to the "ideal groom", the god Rama, in the epic Ramayana. Importantly, the kanyādān ritual occurs right before the Sindoor ritual (sindurdan).

See also
Vivaah
Marriage in Hinduism

References

Further reading
 Gutschow, Niels; Michaels, Axel; Bau, Christian (2008). The Girl's Hindu Marriage to the Bel Fruit: Ihi and The Girl's Buddhist Marriage to the Bel Fruit: Ihi in Growing up - Hindu and Buddhist Initiation Ritual among Newar Children in Bhaktapur, Nepal. Otto Harrassowitz Verlag, Germany. . pp. 93–173.

Marriage in Hinduism
Newar